Rehfeldt is a surname of German origin. Notable people with the surname include:

Don Rehfeldt (1927–1980), American basketball player
Mathias Rehfeldt (born 1986), German composer, music producer and organist
Robert Rehfeldt (1931–1993), German graphic artist
Torben Rehfeldt (born 1993), German footballer

References

Surnames of German origin